David Fas Rojo (born 16 August 1980) is a Spanish footballer who plays for Atlético Saguntino as a right winger.

External links 
 
 

1980 births
Living people
Footballers from Valencia (city)
Spanish footballers
Association football wingers
Segunda División players
Segunda División B players
Tercera División players
Atlético Levante UD players
Universidad de Las Palmas CF footballers
UD Salamanca players
AD Ceuta footballers
UD Alzira footballers
Huracán Valencia CF players
CD Eldense footballers
Atlético Saguntino players